The 'Baenochaemae, Bainochaimai (Ancient Greek Βαινοχαῖμαι) were a Germanic people recorded only in the Geography of Claudius Ptolemy, who described them as living near the Elbe.

The name is generally considered to be equivalent to the modern term "Bohemian" in its origins, although this does not mean that this people is ancestral to the modern Bohemians, or speak an ancestral language, or live in Bohemia. Rather the name represents a combination of the more ancient tribal name of the Boii, and the Germanic word found in modern German heim, or English "home". (The Boii's name is also found in "Bavaria", and they had lived in a large regions encompassing both of the modern regions, plus parts of modern Moravia, Hungary, Lower Austria and northern Italy. The Italian city of Bologne, Latin Bononia is named after them.)

During Roman imperial times a part of the general area of the modern Czech Republic had been settled by Suebian Germanic tribes, most notably the Marcomanni under King Marobodus. Around 100 AD Tacitus reported that in the area once inhabited by the Boii, north of the Danube, south of the Main, east of the old territory of the Helvetii, and west of the Hercynian forest: "The name Boiemum still survives, marking the old tradition of the place, though the population has been changed."

Strabo wrote that in the south of Germany, among the hills or mountains north of the Danube (which are not yet as big as the Alps further south)......is the Hercynian Forest, and also the tribes of the Suevi, some of which dwell inside the forest, as, for instance, the tribes of the Coldui, in whose territory is Boihaemum, the domain of Marabodus, the place whither he caused to migrate, not only several other peoples, but in particular the Marcomanni, his fellow-tribesmen; for after his return from Rome this man, who before had been only a private citizen, was placed in charge of the affairs of state, for, as a youth he had been at Rome and had enjoyed the favor of Augustus, and on his return he took the rulership and acquired, in addition to the peoples aforementioned, the Lugii (a large tribe), the Zumi, the Butones, the Mugilones, the Sibini, and also the Semnones, a large tribe of the Suevi themselves.

According to Ptolemy's account, a tribe using this name lived near the river Elbe, east of the Melibokus mountains, which were probably not the modern Melibokus, but the Harz mountains, or Thüringerwald or both. This is, he reports, in turn north of the Askiburgium mountains (probably the modern Sudetes) and the Lugi Buri, which are in turn north of the source of the Vistula river. This position may be north of both modern Bohemia and modern Bavaria.

Ptolemy also mentions a large people named the Baimoi (or Baemi) whose name is often considered to be simply a different Greek transliteration of the same word. However the Baimoi are found to the south, on the north side of the Danube before it turns south in Hungary, living near the Quadi and the Luna forest.

References

See also
 List of Germanic peoples

Early Germanic peoples